The Carnarvon Tablet is an ancient Egyptian inscription in hieratic recording the defeat of the Hyksos by Kamose.

Discovery

It was found in 1908 by Lord Carnarvon on two wooden tablets covered stucco in fine plaster. It was discovered amongst pottery debris on a ledge close to the entrance of a tomb near the mouth of the Deir el-Bahari valley. 

Howard Carter believed this tomb to date from the Seventeenth Dynasty. But actually it is now believed that the tablet goes back to the Eighteenth Dynasty of Egypt -- only a little later.

On the reverse side of tablet no. 1 is inscribed the beginning of The Maxims of Ptahhotep. On the obverse side of this tablet is a description of Kamose's victory over the Hyksos. 

The tablet is believed to be a schoolboy's exercise, but the text proved to be very important. 

As early as 1916, Sir Alan Gardiner assumed that the First Carnarvon Tablet must be a copy of some commemorative stela of pharaoh Kamose. Less than 20 years later, his thesis was confirmed when French Egyptologists Lacau and Chévrier were working on the Third Pylon of Karnak and made the important discovery of two stela fragments. The smallest of them was found in 1932. And in 1935, the larger fragment appeared. 

Thus, it emerged that the text was copied from Kamose's stelas in Karnak. These newer stelae were published in 1939.

On tablet no. 2 there is a heavily damaged inscription.

Contents
In the inscription, Kamose exclaims (in a translation by James B. Pritchard):

Let me understand what this strength of mine is for! (One) prince is in Avaris, another is in Ethiopia, and (here) I sit associated with an Asiatic and a Negro! Each man has his slice of this Egypt, dividing up the land with me. I cannot pass by him as far as Memphis, the waters of Egypt, (but), behold, he has Hermopolis. No man can settle down, being despoiled by the imposts of the Asiatics. I will grapple with him, that I may cut open his belly! My wish is to save Egypt and to smite the Asiatics!

Sir Alan Gardiner provides the following alternative translation, noting the control of Upper Egypt by the Kerma culture of Nubia:

Notes

References

Alan H. Gardiner, ‘The Defeat of the Hyksos by Kamōse: The Carnarvon Tablet, No. I’, The Journal of Egyptian Archaeology, Vol. 3, No. 2/3 (Apr. - Jul., 1916), pp. 95-110.
Battiscombe Gunn and Alan H. Gardiner, ‘New Renderings of Egyptian Texts: II. The Expulsion of the Hyksos’, The Journal of Egyptian Archaeology, Vol. 5, No. 1 (Jan., 1918), pp. 36–56.
James B. Pritchard, Ancient Near Eastern Texts Relating to the Old Testament. Third Edition (Princeton: Princeton University Press, 1969).

Further reading
The Earl of Carnarvon and Howard Carter, Five Years' Explorations at Thebes (London: Henry Frowde Oxford University, 1912), plate xxvii, xxviii and pp. 36–37.

External links
Photographs of the inscription

2nd-millennium BC literature
1908 archaeological discoveries
Ancient Egyptian stelas
Individual wooden objects
Archaeological discoveries in Egypt
Eighteenth Dynasty of Egypt